Sudheer Karamana (born 24 May 1971) is an Indian actor who appears mainly in Malayalam cinema. He is the son of actor Karamana Janardanan Nair.

Personal life
He is the eldest son to actor Karamana Janardanan Nair and Jaya, at Karamana, Thiruvananthapuram. He has two brothers Sunil and Sujay. He attended the Kendriya Vidyalaya Pattom school, then later went on to finish a Geography degree from the University College Thiruvananthapuram and also received a Bachelor of Education from the Government College of Teacher Education, Thiruvananthapuram. After his graduation he worked at the Centre for Earth Science Studies, in Thiruvananthapuram. Then he worked as a teacher at Christ Nagar School, Thiruvananthapuram, and M.E.S Indian school, Qatar in 1993. Later in 1998 he returned from Qatar to join at Govt Girl's Higher Secondary School, Venganoor as a teacher. In 2003 he became the principal there. He has been the Principal of Girl's Higher Secondary School, Venganoor, Thiruvananthapuram for 13 years.

He is married to a school teacher at Sasthamangalam Higher Secondary School. He and his wife have a son and a daughter. He is settled in Thiruvananthapuram with his family.

Filmography

All films are in Malayalam language unless otherwise noted.

References

External links

Sudheer Karamana at MSI

Male actors from Thiruvananthapuram
Male actors in Malayalam cinema
Indian male film actors
21st-century Indian male actors
Living people
Kendriya Vidyalaya alumni
1971 births